Héctor Rubén Takayama Tohara (born 5 April 1972) is a Peruvian former football player who runs a football academy in Lima.

Club career
Japanese Peruvian Takayama was born in Lima. He played for several clubs in Peru, Japan and Finland. In the Finnish Veikkausliiga, he played 49 times for FC Jazz scoring 8 goals. He also played for the Finnish club in the 2001 UEFA Intertoto Cup.

Sources 
Hector Takayama,  Futbol Peruano
Veikkausliiga statistics

References 

1972 births
Living people
Footballers from Lima
Peruvian people of Japanese descent
Association football midfielders
Peruvian footballers
Sport Boys footballers
Unión Huaral footballers
Deportivo Municipal footballers
Sagan Tosu players
FC Jazz players
Veikkausliiga players
Peruvian expatriate footballers
Expatriate footballers in Japan
Expatriate footballers in Finland